Edoardo Croci (born 15 November 1961, Milan) is an Italian environmentalist and politician.

Ecopass
As Milan city Councilor for Mobility, Transport and the Environment, he introduced an innovative  urban road pricing toll, related to fine dust emissions, to access the city centre since 2 January 2008. The system called Ecopass has been defined as a pollution charge  in the category of Congestion pricing systems. Ecopass reduced PM10 emissions by 23% in the first 11 months of operation. It has been studied by researchers and policy makers worldwide as an example of transport economics. 
Ecopass reduced congestion (the congestion index fell by 4,7%) and improved road safety (a 10.5% drop in accidents in the toll zone).

City referendum
After leaving the Municipality he assumed the role of President of the “committee for referendums on the environment and the quality of life in Milan” in 2010.  The committee promoted referendums on mobility, energy, water, green, and the world EXPO 2015. All the referendums were approved with votes between 79% and 95%. The experience is considered an exemplar case of environmental democracy at the international level, as it was sponsored by  deputy majors of five major European cities.

References

Italian environmentalists
The Liberals (Italy) politicians
21st-century Italian politicians
Local politicians in Italy
1961 births
Living people
Politicians from Milan